The 1964 Hawaii Rainbows football team represented the University of Hawaiʻi at Mānoa as an independent during the 1964 NCAA College Division football season. In their third season under head coach Jim Asato, the Rainbows compiled a 4–5 record.

Schedule

References

Hawaii
Hawaii Rainbow Warriors football seasons
Hawaii Rainbows football